Endotricha lobibasalis is a species of snout moth in the genus Endotricha. It is found in Australia, the Dampier Archipelago, New Guinea, China (Hainan) and Indonesia.

References

Moths described in 1906
Endotrichini